William Doyle may refer to:
 Willie Doyle (William Joseph Gabriel Doyle, 1873–1917), Irish Jesuit priest and British Army chaplain
 William Doyle (businessman), CEO of the Potash Corporation of Saskatchewan
 William Doyle (historian) (born 1942), English historian
 William Doyle (Irish businessman), CEO of Newbridge Silverware
 William Doyle (died 1983), County Court Judge from Northern Ireland murdered by the IRA in 1983
 William Doyle (musician) (born 1991), English electronic musician, previously known by his stage name East India Youth
 William Edward Doyle (1911–1986), United States federal judge
 William P. Doyle, former Commissioner of the Federal Maritime Commission
 William M. S. Doyle (1769–1828), artist
 William T. Doyle (born 1926), Republican member of the Vermont Senate